Rayl is a unit of acoustic impedance.

Rayl may also refer to:

Rayl, California, ghost town, United States
Jimmy Rayl (1941–2019), American basketball player

See also
Rail (disambiguation)
Rale (disambiguation)